Laurent Adamowicz is a French businessman, entrepreneur, lecturer, author, and public health advocate. He is the founder and president of the public charity EChO – Eradicate Childhood Obesity Foundation and a member of the Harvard T.H. Chan School of Public Health Nutrition Round Table.

Education 
Adamowicz graduated with a B.A. from ESCP Europe and subsequently obtained an MBA from the Wharton School.

Career 
Adamowicz was a co-founder of Global Commerce Technology Company (GC Tech SA), a technology company that introduced the first micro-payments system on the Internet in 1995.

He organized the buyout of Fauchon in January 1998. Fauchon operated 650 stores in 34 countries.

Since 2005, Adamovicz he has been a senior lecturer, a speaker at TED Conferences, an author, and a judge of academic competitions, including the annual business plan competition at the Wharton School of the University of Pennsylvania, Harvard College's Top Chef Competition, the Harvard President’s Challenge, and the Harvard T. H. Chan School of Public Health and Harvard Law School Deans' Challenge.

Bon'App 
Laurent Adamowicz founded Bon'App in 2010, a social enterprise designed to combat the global epidemic of obesity through the use of an application that told users what was in their food. The app used simple language about calories, sugar, salt and 'bad fat' (the sum of saturated fats and trans fats). In 2012, Bon'App initiated a research program and clinical study in public schools in Baton Rouge, Louisiana, with Pennington Biomedical Research Center to improve the nutrition conditions of children in public schools in the region. In 2013, the Harvard Business School published a case study entitled: "Advanced Leadership Pathways: Laurent Adamowicz and Bon'App".

EChO - Eradicate Childhood Obesity Foundation 
Laurent Adamowicz founded EChO - Eradicate Childhood Obesity Foundation in 2015. EChO - Eradicate Childhood Obesity Foundation is a 501(c)(3) public charity based in Cambridge, Massachusetts. The foundation advocates universal nutrition education, from kindergarten to medical schools, and a new food labeling system that it intends to test in public schools in the Boston/Cambridge area. EChO - Eradicate Childhood Obesity Foundation focuses on technology-based education interventions. It created the first augmented reality app for public health, called SugAR Poke.

Conferences 

Adamowicz has spoken at several public conferences, notably at TED Conferences; His TED Talks are entitled: "What has your food been eating?", translated in 12 languages, and "Secondary Sugar Kills", translated in 35 languages.

References 

Year of birth missing (living people)
Living people
Businesspeople from Paris
Non-profit executives
French health activists
French non-fiction writers